Belladonna  is a 2015 Croatian drama film written and directed by Dubravka Turić. It was awarded Best Short Film at the 72nd edition of the Venice Film Festival. It was also screened at the 2016 Sundance Film Festival.

Plot

Cast 

  Aleksandra Naumov 	as Sasha 
 Nada Đurevska as Nada
 Lana Barić 	
 Drazen Kuhn 	 
 Anita Matkovic

References

External links  
 

2015 short films
Croatian drama films
Croatian short films
2015 drama films
2015 films
2010s Croatian-language films